The men's keirin at the 2011 UCI Track Cycling World Championships was held on 26 March. 33 athletes participated in the contest. After the six qualifying heats, the fastest rider in each heat advanced to the second round. The riders that did not advance to the second round raced in four repechage heats. The first rider in each heat advanced to the second round along with the eight that qualified before.

The first three riders from each of the two second round heats advanced to the final, and the remaining riders raced a consolation 7–12 place final.

Results

First round
The first round was held at 10:00.

First round repechage
The first round repechage was held at 11:50.

Second round
The second round was held at 14:50.

Final 7–12 places

Final
The finals were held at 16:10.

References

2011 UCI Track Cycling World Championships
UCI Track Cycling World Championships – Men's keirin